John Gunn (16 December 1884 – 27 June 1959) was an Australian politician who served as the 29th Premier of South Australia, leading the South Australian Branch of the Australian Labor Party to government at the 1924 election.

Early life
Gunn was born in Bendigo, Victoria, the second of nine children to a Scottish miner and his wife. Gunn's father died when he was young, forcing him to work as a delivery boy to support his mother and siblings while studying at night classes.

Gunn worked a variety of jobs in Melbourne and in the Western Australian timber mills before returning to Melbourne to marry Haidee Smith on 8 September 1908.  They then moved to Adelaide where Gunn found work as a horse-lorry driver on the Port Road. He soon became the President of the South Australian branch of the Federated Carters and Driver's Union and organised the 1910 Drivers' Strike, which secured reduced working hours, although he made enemies in the wealthy and influential Adelaide Establishment, who considered him a dangerous communist.

Politics
Gunn's success with the Carters and Driver's Union led to his election as President of the  United Trades and Labour Council of South Australia in 1911 and, as his star continued to rise, he was elected to Adelaide City Council in 1914, serving to 1916, when he became Federal President of the Federated Carters and Driver's Union.

"Greatly respected for his tactful courtesy and self-control", Gunn entered the South Australian House of Assembly at the 1915 election as a Labor member for the Electoral district of Adelaide.  He soon emerged as a leading anti-conscriptionist in the bitter internal Labor fight over conscription which led to a split in the party. Resigning his seat, Gunn stood unsuccessfully for the federal House of Representatives Division of Boothby as an anti-conscriptionist candidate at the 1917 federal election but returned to state parliament by regaining his Adelaide seat at the 1918 state election.

While many Labor party members were opposed to conscription, party leadership, including premier Crawford Vaughan, were in favour and either resigned or were expelled from the party, leaving Labor with a rump of inexperienced members of parliament following their 1918 election loss.  Gunn, aged 32, was elected leader of the Labor Party and Leader of the Opposition, a move that concerned the Establishment, who recalled the 1910 Driver's Strike and thought he should not be allowed near the reins of power.  A media campaign against Gunn began in earnest.

The Labor Party lost the 1921 election but was able to regain a number of Adelaide-based seats they had lost in 1918 and, under Gunn's leadership, defeated Henry Barwell's Liberal Federation at the 1924 election following a split between the Liberal Federation and its erstwhile ally, the Country Party. Gunn became Premier and Treasurer of South Australia as well as Minister for Irrigation and Minister for Repatriation at age 39.
   

As Premier, Gunn established the State Bank of South Australia and developed Colonel Light Gardens, one of Australia's first planned suburbs.  He also improved public service working conditions, built more roads and encouraged rural settlement. A "Thousand Homes Scheme" was carried out to improve the quality and supply of housing for needy families, spending on education was increased, provided better medical facilities and new junior technical schools, higher wages for teachers, and more scholarships. Working conditions were also improved, while measures were undertaken to improve conditions in rural areas "with a visionary afforestation programme in addition to better roads and improvements in access to bore water and technical expertise in agriculture." His reforms impressed many and even received grudging praise from the previously hostile media, who realised he had mellowed into a more moderate figure than the strike leader of 15 years prior.

Gunn still raised the ire of conservatives through his plans to redraw the Assembly electorate boundaries, introduce a proportional representation electoral system, introduce adult franchise to the Legislative Council and establish a state government insurance commission, all of which were defeated by the conservative controlled Legislative Council.

Having gained a reputation as a competent administrator and Premier, Gunn surprised many when he suddenly resigned from the Premiership and parliament on 9 August 1926 to accept a Melbourne-based position with the Commonwealth Development and Migration Commission on a greatly improved salary. Lionel Hill took over the Labor leadership and Premiership. When the position ended, he accepted a federal government appointment in 1930 and moved to Canberra.  When Australian Prime Minister Joseph Lyons declined to renew Gunn's contract in 1935, Gunn, estranged from his wife and family and possibly in debt, suffered a nervous breakdown. Little was known of his subsequent life.

Death
Gunn died in poverty in Waterfall, New South Wales. So far was his fall into obscurity that the South Australian media was not aware of their former Premier's death for some weeks.

References

External links

 

|-

|-

|-

|-

Premiers of South Australia
Members of the South Australian House of Assembly
People from Bendigo
1884 births
1959 deaths
Australian people of Scottish descent
Leaders of the Opposition in South Australia
Treasurers of South Australia
Australian Labor Party members of the Parliament of South Australia
20th-century Australian politicians